Tetraacetyl diborate is an organoboron compound with the molecular formula (CH3COO)2BOB(CH3COO)2.

Preparation
It is not well known and was discovered accidentally by an attempt trying to make boron triacetate in the 1950s. It was made by reacting boric acid and acetic anhydride around  under nitrogen which created tetraacetyl diborate and acetic acid. It crystallized as a colorless solid.

2H3BO3 + 5(CH3CO)2O → (CH3COO)2BOB(CH3COO)2 + 6CH3COOH

Reactions
Tetraacetyl diborate reacts with methanol to form water and diacetyl methoxyboron.

References

Borate esters